LP 145-141 (also LAWD 37) is an isolated white dwarf located 15 light years from the Solar System.  According to a 2009 paper, it is the fourth closest known white dwarf to the Sun (after Sirius B, Procyon B, and van Maanen's star.)

History of observations
LP 145-141 is known at least from 1917, when its proper motion was published by R. T. A. Innes and H. E. Wood in Volume 37 of Circular of the Union Observatory. The corresponding designation is UO 37. (Note: this designation is not unique for this star, that is all other stars, listed in the table in the Volume 37 of this Circular, also could be called by this name).

Space motion
LP 145-141 may be a member of the Wolf 219 moving group, which has seven possible members. These stars share a similar motion through space, which may indicate a common origin. This group has an estimated space velocity of 160 km/s and is following a highly eccentric orbit through the Milky Way galaxy.

Properties
White dwarfs are no longer generating energy at their cores through nuclear fusion, and instead are steadily radiating away their remaining heat. LP 145-141 has a DQ spectral classification, indicating that it is a rare type of white dwarf which displays evidence of atomic or molecular carbon in its spectrum.

In 2019, LP 145-141 was observed passing in front of a more distant star. The bending of starlight by the gravitational field of LP 145-141 observed by the Hubble Space Telescope allowed its mass to be directly measured. The estimated mass of LP 145-141 is 0.56±0.08 M☉, which fits the expected range of a white dwarf with a carbon-oxygen core. This measurement marked the first direct gravitational mass determination of a single white dwarf.

LP 145-141 has only 56% of the Sun's mass, but it is the remnant of a massive main-sequence star that had an estimated 4.4 solar masses. While it was on the main sequence, it probably was a spectral class B star (in the range B4-B9). Most of the star's original mass was shed after it passed into the asymptotic giant branch stage, just prior to becoming a white dwarf.

Search for companions
A survey with the Hubble Space Telescope revealed no visible orbiting companions, at least down to the limit of detection.

Its proximity, mass and temperature have led to it being considered a good candidate to look for Jupiter-like planets. Its relatively large mass and high temperature mean that the system is relatively short-lived and hence of more recent origin.

See also
 List of nearest stars

References

External links
 CC 658

Local Bubble
Musca (constellation)
White dwarfs
057367
0440